Pseudocossus boisduvalii is a moth in the family Cossidae. It was described by Viette in 1955. It is found in Madagascar.

References

Natural History Museum Lepidoptera generic names catalog

Moths described in 1955
Pseudocossinae